The Liberal Party of Macedonia (Liberalna partija na Makedonija) is a conservative-liberal political party in North Macedonia. The party was a member of the Alliance of Liberals and Democrats for Europe Party but is no longer a member. It is currently led by Ivon Velickovski.

History
The Liberal Party was established on 5 October 1990 as the Union of Reform Forces in Macedonia (Сојуз на реформски сили, Sojuz na reformski sili, SRS). Although it shared its name with the Union of Reform Forces operating in other parts of Yugoslavia and headed by Prime Minister Ante Marković, it was not directly linked to the party. However, due to Marković's popularity, the party performed well in the 1990 parliamentary elections, receiving 13.3% of the vote in the first round and 16.1% in the second, winning a total of 11 seats. The party also ran in an alliance with the Young Democratic-Progressive Party (MDPS) in some areas, and with the Social Democratic Party in others. The joint SRS–MDPS candidates won six seats, whilst the alliance with the Social Democratic Party failed to win a seat.

In 1991 the party merged with the Young Democratic-Progressive Party, and was renamed Reform Forces in Macedonia–Liberal Party, before becoming the Liberal Party in June 1993. It was part of the Alliance for Macedonia in the 1994 general elections. The Alliance won 87 seats in the Assembly, whilst the Liberal Party won a further five seats running alone and one seat where it ran in alliance with the Social Democratic Union.

In April 1997 the Liberal Party merged with the Democratic Party to form the Liberal Democratic Party (LDP). However, several former members of the Liberal Party broke away from the LDP in December 1999 to re-established the party.

The party ran in an alliance with the VMRO-DPMNE for the 2002 elections, but the alliance was defeated by the Together for Macedonia coalition. The two remained in an alliance with the addition of several other parties for the 2006 elections, which it emerged from as the largest bloc in the Assembly with 45 of the 120 seats, of which two were held by the Liberal Party.

Prior to the 2008 elections the party joined Sun – Coalition for Europe alongside the Social Democratic Union (SDSM) and several other parties. The coalition lost the elections to the VMRO-DPMNE-led For a Better Macedonia alliance. The Liberal Party remained in alliance with the SDSM for the 2011 elections, again losing to the VMRO-DPMNE-led alliance.

Prior to the 2014 elections the party became part of the Citizen Option for Macedonia coalition.

Members of the Assembly

References

External links
Official website

Political parties established in 1990
Liberal parties in North Macedonia
Alliance of Liberals and Democrats for Europe Party member parties
1990 establishments in the Socialist Republic of Macedonia
Political parties in Yugoslavia